Chimbo Canton is a canton of Ecuador, located in the Bolívar Province.  Its capital is the town of Chimbo.  Its population at the 2001 census was 15,005.

Demographics
Ethnic groups as of the Ecuadorian census of 2010:
Mestizo  92.1%
Indigenous  3.5%
White  3.1%
Afro-Ecuadorian  1.0%
Montubio  0.4%
Other  0.1%

References

Cantons of Bolívar Province (Ecuador)